Spring Garden, also known as the Lewis Homestead, is a historic home located near Laurel, Sussex County, Delaware.  It is an "L"-shaped, brick and frame dwelling built in three sections over a 100-year period. The large brick main core was built about 1782, and is a -story, double-pile, center-hall plan structure with a three-bay facade in the Federal style.  The interior has Georgian style details.  It has a summer kitchen addition built about 1860, and it is a -story, single-pile structure added to the rear of the main core. About 1880, a large, two-story, frame addition was built onto the west gable end of the original brick section. It is in the Victorian Gothic style.

It was added to the National Register of Historic Places in 1982.

References

Houses on the National Register of Historic Places in Delaware
Georgian architecture in Delaware
Federal architecture in Delaware
Gothic Revival architecture in Delaware
Houses completed in 1782
Houses in Sussex County, Delaware
Laurel, Delaware
National Register of Historic Places in Sussex County, Delaware
1782 establishments in Delaware